A METATOY is a sheet, formed by a two-dimensional array of small, telescopic optical components, that switches the path of transmitted light rays.  METATOY is an acronym for "metamaterial for rays", representing a number of analogies with metamaterials; METATOYs even satisfy a few definitions of metamaterials, but are certainly not metamaterials in the usual sense.  When seen from a distance, the view through each individual telescopic optical component acts as one pixel of the view through the METATOY as a whole.  In the simplest case, the individual optical components are all identical; the METATOY then behaves like a homogeneous, but pixellated, window that can have very unusual optical properties (see the picture of the view through a METATOY).

METATOYs are usually treated within the framework of geometrical optics; the light-ray-direction change performed by a METATOY is described by a mapping of the direction of any incoming light ray onto the corresponding direction of the outgoing ray.  The light-ray-direction mappings can be very general. METATOYs can even create pixellated light-ray fields that could not exist in non-pixellated form due to a condition imposed by wave optics.

Much of the work on METATOYs is currently theoretical, backed up by computer simulations.  A small number of experiments have been performed to date; more experimental work is ongoing.

Examples of METATOYs

Examples of inhomogeneous METATOYs include the moiré magnifier, which is based on deliberately "mis-aligned" pairs of confocal microlens arrays; Fresnel lenses, which can be seen as non-homogeneous METATOYs made from prisms;
and frosted glass, which can be seen as an extreme case of an inhomogeneous, random METATOY made from prisms.

Examples of METATOYs as defined above have existed long before analogies with metamaterials were noted and it was recognized that METATOYs can perform wave-optically forbidden ray-direction mappings (in pixellated form).

Wave-optical constraints on light-ray fields and METATOYs
Wave optics describes light at a more fundamental level than geometrical optics.  In the ray-optics limit (in which the optical wavelength tends towards zero) of scalar optics (in which light is described as a scalar wave, an approximation that works well for paraxial light with uniform polarization), the light-ray field r corresponding to a light wave  is its phase gradient,

where  is the phase of the wave .  But according to vector calculus, the curl of any gradient is zero, that is

and therefore

This last equation is a condition, derived from wave optics, on light-ray fields.
(Each of the three equations that makes up this vector equation expresses the symmetry of the second spatial derivatives, which is how the condition was initially formulated.)

Using the example of ray-rotation sheets, it was shown that METATOYs can create light-ray fields that do not satisfy the above condition on light-ray fields.

Relationship with metamaterials
METATOYs are not metamaterials in the standard sense.  The acronym "metamaterial for rays" was chosen because of a number of similarities between METATOYs and metamaterials, which are discussed below, along with the differences.
In addition, metamaterials provided the inspiration for early METATOYs research, as summarized in the following quote:
Motivated by the desire to build optical elements that have some of the visual properties of metamaterials on an everyday size scale and across the entire visible wavelength spectrum, we recently started to investigate sheets formed by miniaturized optical elements that change the direction of transmitted light rays.

Similarities with metamaterials
In a number of ways, METATOYs are analogous to metamaterials:
structure:  metamaterials are arrays of small (sub-wavelength size) wave-optical components (electro-magnetic circuits resonant with the optical frequency), whereas METATOYs are arrays of small (so that they work well as pixels), telescopic, "ray-optical components";
functionality:  both metamaterials and METATOYs can behave like homogeneous materials, in the case of metamaterials a volume of material, in the case of METATOYs a sheet material, in both cases with very unusual optical properties such as negative refraction.

Differences with metamaterials
Arguably amongst the most startling properties of metamaterials are some that are fundamentally wave-optical, and therefore not reproduced in METATOYs.  These include amplification of evanescent waves, which can, in principle, lead to perfect lenses ("superlenses")  and magnifying superlenses ("hyperlenses"); reversal of the phase velocity; reversal of the Doppler shift.

However, because they are not bound by wave-optical constraints on light-ray fields, it can be argued that METATOYs can perform light-ray-direction changes that metamaterials could not, unless a METATOY was effectively built out of metamaterials.

See also
Fresnel lens
Zone plate

References

External links
Didactic article on METATOYs

Geometrical optics
Optical devices
Optical materials
Imaging